Central Midlands may refer to:

 Central Midlands Coastal Football League
 Midlands Central (European Parliament constituency)
 Central Midlands Football League
 Central Midlands Regional Transit Authority

See also 

 Midlands (disambiguation)